Zornoza is a Basque surname. Notable people with the surname include:

Claudia Zornoza (born 1990), Spanish footballer
Claudia Zornoza (born 1990), Peruvian badminton player
Pippi Zornoza (born 1978), American artist

Basque-language surnames